Roberto Marcos Dovetta (born 24 April 1988 in Santa Fe) is an Argentine football striker. He plays for Libertad.

Career
Dovetta made his professional debut for Lanús in a 5-0 home win against Olimpo de Bahía Blanca on 3 July 2005 aged 17. He made sporadic appearances for the team until 2010 when he was loaned out to 2nd division side Ferro Carril Oeste. However, due to the team's economic difficulties, the transfer did not go through. Dovetta ended up signing with CD Leganés in the Segunda División B of Spain.

References

External links
 Argentine Primera statistics at Futbol XXI 

1988 births
Living people
Footballers from Santa Fe, Argentina
Argentine footballers
Association football forwards
Ferro Carril Oeste footballers
Club Atlético Lanús footballers
Unión de Mar del Plata footballers
Curicó Unido footballers
Primera B de Chile players
Argentine Primera División players
Expatriate footballers in Chile
Expatriate footballers in Spain